The Ashida Cabinet is the 47th Cabinet of Japan headed by Hitoshi Ashida from March 10, 1948 to October 15, 1948.

Cabinet

References 

Cabinet of Japan
1948 establishments in Japan
Cabinets established in 1948
Cabinets disestablished in 1948
1948 disestablishments in Japan